Louis Schweitzer (February 5, 1899 – September 20, 1971) was a Russian-born United States paper industrialist and philanthropist. He was an executive at the family paper company (now Schweitzer-Mauduit International) until its sale. He purchased the U.S. radio station WBAI from Theodore Deglin for $34,000 in 1957. An idealist, eccentric, and long-time radio enthusiast, Schweitzer ran the station as a personal hobby and an artistic endeavour, broadcasting the latest in music, politics, and ideas.

Schweitzer viewed radio as an art form, but became increasingly disillusioned with commercial radio as WBAI became more successful. After reading about KPFA and Pacifica Radio in Los Angeles, Schweitzer decided to donate WBAI (which was then valued at around $200,000) to Pacifica, and proceeded to do so in January 1960. WBAI became the third Pacifica station.

Schweitzer's other philanthropic activities included the donation of 1% of his annual income to the United Nations, and the ex gratia purchase of a barber shop on behalf of the barber who had previously rented the premises. Schweitzer's only requirement was an entitlement to a free haircut after regular business hours upon request.

In 1961, he founded the Vera Foundation, later renamed the Vera Institute of Justice, to reduce the numbers of poor people awaiting trial on New York City's Rikers Island. Under Schweitzer's leadership, Vera pioneered the use of controlled, experimental design research methods in state courts. When, in 1966, these experiments convinced the federal government to rewrite the laws governing bail in criminal cases, President Lyndon Johnson credited Schweitzer.

Schweitzer also proposed a "juvenile disarmament" resolution to the UN whereby toy guns and water pistols would be prohibited as an initial step towards effective disarmament and arms control. In response to criticism that this was a naive and quixotic proposal, Schweitzer stated, "The naive should inherit the earth because the realists have done such a lousy job".

In 1931 he married the actress Lucille Lortel. In 1955, he bought her the Theater de Lys as an anniversary present.

Schweitzer died of a heart attack on September 20, 1971 aboard the ocean liner SS France, returning from Europe.

References

WFHB Bloomington Community Radio, contains some historical Pacifica information.
Louis J. Schweitzer Dead; Founder of Nera lnstitute[sic] By LAURIE JOHNSTON, New York Times, September 21, 1971, Page 40. 
Obituaries: Louis Schweitzer dies on ship returning home, The Hour (Norwalk, Connecticut), September 21, 1971

External links
 New York Times obituary Sep 21, 1971: Louis J. Schweitzer Dead; Founder of Vera Institute

Papermakers
1899 births
1971 deaths
20th-century American businesspeople
Emigrants from the Russian Empire to the United States
American people of Russian-Jewish descent